El's Appendices: The Scroll Of Lost Tales is the fifth album by Philadelphia, Pennsylvania rap group The Lost Children of Babylon, released on January 10, 2012. The album was released on their own label LCOB Productions. The album's lyrics carry on the traditional themes of spiritualism, philosophy, masonry, astrology, and right knowledge.

Track listing

References

The Lost Children of Babylon albums
2005 albums
Babygrande Records albums